Chudá Lehota is a village and municipality in Bánovce nad Bebravou District in the Trenčín Region of north-western Slovakia.

History
In historical records the village was first mentioned in 1400.

Geography
The municipality lies at an altitude of 223 metres and covers an area of 3.667 km2. It has a population of about 221 people.

Genealogical resources

The records for genealogical research are available at the state archive "Statny Archiv in Nitra, Slovakia"

 Roman Catholic church records (births/marriages/deaths): 1781-1896 (parish B)

See also
 List of municipalities and towns in Slovakia

References

External links
 Official page
Surnames of living people in Chuda Lehota

Villages and municipalities in Bánovce nad Bebravou District